The Dar-Ibrahim Mosque is a mosque in San Salvador, El Salvador.

History
The mosque was constructed in 2007.

Architecture
The mosque resembles the shape of a house without any dome or minaret.

See also
 Islam in El Salvador

References

2007 establishments in El Salvador
Buildings and structures in San Salvador
Islam in El Salvador
Mosques completed in 2007
Mosques in Central America
Religious buildings and structures in El Salvador